

Ports in Guangzhou
Guangzhou Port (former Guangzhou Port and Huangpu Port)
Nansha Port
Lianhuashan Port

Wharfs in downtown Guangzhou along the Pearl River
Jinshazhou Wharf
Shiweitang Wharf
Huangpu Military Academy Wharf
Haixinsha Wharf
Canton Tower Wharf
Tianzi Wharf  	 
Fangcun Wharf  	 
Xidi Wharf   
Zhongda Wharf  	 	 
Xinzhou Wharf
Shenjing Wharf 	
Changzhou Wharf 	
Yuzhu Dock 	
Shabei Wharf	
Dayuanshuaifu Wharf (Generalissimo Sun Yat-Sen's Mansion Wharf)
Fangzhi Wharf
Qiankou Wharf 	
Shengzong Wharf  (Guangdong Federation of Trade Unions Wharf)	
Haizhuang Wharf 
Aozhou Wharf 	
Baixianke Wharf 	
Baihedong Wharf
Guangzhong Wharf 	
Lianhewei Wharf 	
Shaxi Wharf
Yongxingjie Wharf 	
Tanwei Wharf
Songxi Wharf 	
Xicun Wharf 	
Ruyifang Wharf 	
Huangsha Wharf
Taigucang Wharf (Pacific Wharf, closed)
Liede Dock (demolished)

Ferries in Panyu District and Nansha District
Xinzao Ferry
Suishi Ferry
Nanting Ferry
Daxing Ferry
Dongxiang Ferry
Xisan Ferry
Xi'er Ferry (closed)
Xiyi Ferry (to Haizhu District) 
Xiabei Ferry (to Liwan District)
Weichong Ferry (to Shunde District, Foshan City)
Shalu Ferry (to Huangpu District, closed) 
Beidou Ferry
Basha Ferry (to Shunde District, Foshan City) 
Zhangsong Ferry (to Shunde District, Foshan City) 
Qianfeng Ferry
Dongdao Ferry
Shagongbao Ferry
Shabei Ferry
Guanlong Ferry
Sansha Ferry
Dawen Ferry
Dongfeng Ferry
Xili Ferry
Xinsha Ferry
Xinshayiyuan Ferry (Xinsha Hospital Ferry)
Nan'er Ferry
Miaoqing Ferry
Miaobei Ferry
Guishanongchang Ferry (Guisha Cattle Farm Ferry)
Xinlian'ercun Ferry (to Nansha District)
Fangma Ferry (named Dakui Ferry in Zhongshan) (to Zhongshan City)

Transport in Guangzhou
Guangzhou